Forest Hill is a neighborhood located along the James River in Richmond, Virginia's Southside region. The neighborhood is home to Forest Hill Park, one of the largest public parks in the city.

See also 
 Neighborhoods of Richmond, Virginia
 Richmond, Virginia

References

External links 
 Forest Hill boundaries

Neighborhoods in Richmond, Virginia